Geoffrey Boisselier Davies (26 October 1892 – 26 September 1915) was an English cricketer.

Davies was educated at Rossall School where he played cricket for the school 1909–12, being captain in 1912. He also played for Essex in 1912. He went up to Selwyn College, Cambridge, and played for both Cambridge University and Essex in 1913 and 1914. In the First World War he was commissioned in the Essex Regiment and held the rank of Captain when he was killed in France in 1915.

See also
 List of cricketers who were killed during military service

References

External links

1892 births
1915 deaths
Military personnel from London
English cricketers
Essex cricketers
Cambridge University cricketers
People from Poplar, London
Cricketers from Greater London
People educated at Rossall School
Alumni of Selwyn College, Cambridge
Essex Regiment officers
British military personnel killed in World War I
British Army personnel of World War I